Mariana Paula Fabbiani Martínez (born 8 January 1975) is an Argentine radio and television presenter and actress.

Career
Mariana Fabbiani began her career as an advertising model in her native Argentina, also working in Chile and Mexico in 1988. In 1993 she starred in the music video of the song "Suave" with Luis Miguel.

In 2000 she hosted the radio program Panic Attack, along with Mex Urtizberea and Maju Lozano on FM Supernova from 1:00 to 3:00 pm.

In 2000 and 2001 she wrote and starred in a play called Cenicienta.

In 2002, Channel 13 called on her to lead a variety program aimed at a female and children's audience, Mariana de casa. On that program she also sang, and released an album of her songs. That year the program was also presented theatrically as a play aimed at children, with Mariana as a protagonist and the show's puppets as part of the cast.

That year she also worked as an actress, with appearances on the telenovela  on the same channel.

In 2005, América TV hired her to host  (RSM), produced by Gastón Portal.

In 2006, Telefe called on her to play her first leading role in a fiction series, and to host various television programs.

In 2013, Fabbiani returned to television, but this time on Channel 13, as host of the program El artista del año. After finishing with El artista del año, she started a political program to replace , called El diario de Mariana, which is broadcast in the evenings on Channel 13.

Personal life
Mariana Fabbiani's parents are Silvia Mores and Alfredo Fabbiani. She is the granddaughter of the pianist and composer Mariano Mores and the singer Myrna Mores, and niece of the singer . She has a sister named Paola.

Beginning in 1996 she maintained a relationship with the producer Gastón Portal, son of Raúl Portal. They were married on 15 March 2003. They announced their separation in April 2005.

Since 2006, her partner has been the producer Mariano Chihade, with whom she has two children, Matilda (born 2010) and Máximo (born 2014).

Controversies
Between 4 October and 13 December 2017, the Vidal government paid the sum of almost 5.6 million pesos to the company More Televisión SA, owned by Mariana Fabbiani's husband Mariano Chihade. The payments were made from the Government Treasury, and also from the Provincial Institute of Lottery and Casinos of Buenos Aires Province, each for an amount equal to $70,000. At the same time it was discovered that Vidal paid the production company and Fabbiani's program to show the detention of an opposition deputy.

Modeling
 1992: numerous advertisements in Mexico, Chile, and Argentina
 1993: "Suave" music video with Luis Miguel, filmed in Acapulco
 1998: became the face of the company  in all its television, radio, and graphic advertising
 1999: graphic campaign for the Casino of San Luis
 Host of several business events (Colgate, Nivea, BNL)
 2004: TV commercials for Sensodyne and Revlon
 2010: Commercials for Falabella

Actress
  (Channel 13, 1994)
 Mi familia es un dibujo as Maestra Jimena (Telefe, 1996)
  as María José (1996)
  as Adriana (Channel 13, 2004)

Discography
 2000: Cenicienta...La historia continúa (EMI)
 2002: Mariana de casa

TV programs

Galas
 2006 Martín Fierro Awards, co-presenter (2007)
 2008 Martín Fierro Awards, co-presenter (2009)
 2011 Tato Awards, co-presenter (2011)
 2011 Martín Fierro Awards, co-presenter (2012)
 2012 Tato Awards, presenter (2012)
 2013 , co-presenter (2013)
 2013 Tato Awards, co-presenter (2013)
 2013 Martín Fierro Awards, co-presenter (2014)
 2014 Martín Fierro Awards, co-presenter (2015)
 2015 Martín Fierro Awards, co-presenter (2016)
 2016 Martín Fierro Awards, co-presenter (2017)

Awards

References

External links
 

1975 births
20th-century Argentine actresses
21st-century Argentine actresses
21st-century Argentine women singers
Actresses from Buenos Aires
Argentine female models
Argentine radio presenters
Argentine telenovela actresses
Argentine television personalities
Living people
Argentine women radio presenters
Women television personalities